The Konyak languages, or alternatively the Konyakian or Northern Naga languages, is a branch of Sino-Tibetan languages spoken by various Naga peoples in southeastern Arunachal Pradesh and northeastern Nagaland states of northeastern India. They are not particularly closely related to other Naga languages spoken further to the south, but rather to other Sal languages such as Jingpho and the Bodo-Garo languages. There are many dialects, and villages even a few kilometers apart frequently have to rely on a separate common language.

Proto-Northern Naga, the reconstructed proto-language of the Konyak languages, has been reconstructed by Walter French (1983).

Languages
Konyak–Chang: 
Konyak
Chang 
Wancho
Phom
Khiamniungic
Khiamniungan
Leinong
Makyam
Ponyo
Tangsa–Nocte
Tangsa (Tase)
Muklom
Pangwa Naga
Ponthai
Tikhak
Nocte
Tutsa

Ethnologue 17 adds Makyam (Paungnyuan), while Glottolog adds a Khiamniungic branch within the Konyak-Chang branch. Makyam is most closely related to Leinong (Htangan) (Naw Sawu 2016:6).

Classification
Below is a classification of the Northern Naga (Konyak) languages by Hsiu (2018) based on a computational phylogenetic analysis.

Northern Naga
Makyam
Kuku Nokkone
Makyam, Khale, Santung
Nuclear Northern Naga
Khiamniungic group
Lainong
Anbaw, Hwi Thaik
Wan Ton Tha Mai
Nok Nyo Kha Shang
Lahe (subgroup): Lahe, Khamti, Long Kyan Nok Kone
Ponyo-Gongwan
Ponyo (subgroup): Ponyo Nok Inn, Lang Kheng
Gongwan
Khiamniungan
Konyak-Wancho-Tangsa
Konyak-Wancho
Lao
Konyak
Kyan
Wancho
Wancho (Lower Wancho Hill)
Wancho (Upper Wancho Hill), Karyaw
Chuyo, Gaqkat
Phom
Chang (?)
Tangsa
Tikhak (subgroup): Tikhak, Longchang, Yongkuk, Muklom
Jugli
Shangvan (subgroup): Shangvan, Meitei, Haqcyeng, Ngaimong
Pangwa (subgroup): Kyahi, Mungre, Shanke, Chamchang, Lochang, Dunghi, Moshang, Rera, Lungri, Cholim
Halang (subgroup): Lama, Halang, Haqkhi, Bote
Ringkhu (subgroup): Gaqyi, Shokrang, Henching, Rasa, Lakki, Ringkhu, Khalak, Shangti, Lungkhi, Kochung
Gaqha
Kotlum (subgroup): Kotlum, Raqnu, Aasen, Drancyi, Gaqlun
Kon-Pingku (subgroup): Kon, Pingku, Nyinshao
Sansik
Champhang (subgroup): Nahen, Thamkok, Lumnu, Champhang
Nocte-Tutsa (subgroup): Haqkhun, Tutsa, Ponthai, Hawi, Nocte, Haqsik, Haqchum, Yangno, Haqman

Phom belongs to the Konyak-Wancho branch. Chang  may have originally been a Konyak-Wancho language that was heavily influenced by Ponyo-Khiamniungan-Lainong. The homeland of Northern Naga is placed in the Lahe Township area.

References

French, Walter T. 1983. Northern Naga: A Tibeto-Burman mesolanguage. Ph.D. Dissertation, The City University of New York.
Stirn, Aglaja, and Peter van Ham. 2003. The hidden world of the Naga: living traditions in Northeast India and Burma. Munich: Prestel.
Saul, Jamie D. 2005. The Naga of Burma: Their festivals, customs and way of life. Bangkok, Thailand: Orchid Press.
George van Driem (2001) Languages of the Himalayas: An Ethnolinguistic Handbook of the Greater Himalayan Region. Brill.

External links
Classifying Konyak and other Naga languages

Sal languages
Languages of India